The following television stations broadcast on digital channel 8 in the United States:

 K08AK-D in Port Orford, etc., Oregon
 K08AP-D in Pateros/Mansfield, Washington
 K08AY-D in Winthrop-Twisp, Washington
 K08BO-D in Virgin, Utah
 K08CB-D in Lund & Preston, Nevada
 K08CW-D in Malott/Wakefield, Washington
 K08CX-D in Tonasket, Washington
 K08CY-D in Riverside, Washington
 K08EN-D in Pine Valley, etc., Utah
 K08ET-D in Durango, Colorado
 K08EZ-D in Mink Creek, Idaho, on virtual channel 3, which rebroadcasts KIDK
 K08FS-D in Dodson, Montana
 K08HN-D in Aspen, Colorado
 K08HU-D in Aleknagik, Alaska
 K08IO-D in Wells, Nevada
 K08IP-D in Baker, Montana
 K08JP-D in Dryden, Washington
 K08JV-D in Broadus, Montana
 K08KA-D in Girdwood, Alaska
 K08KD-D in Alakanuk, Alaska
 K08KO-D in Cooper Landing, Alaska
 K08KT-D in Boulder, Montana
 K08KW-D in Richland, Oregon
 K08LG-D in Silver Lake, etc., Oregon
 K08LI-D in White Sulphur Springs, Montana
 K08LL-D in Dolores, Colorado
 K08LN-D in Harrison, Nebraska
 K08LS-D in Elko, Nevada
 K08MB-D in Weber Canyon, Colorado
 K08ND-D in Akron, Colorado, on virtual channel 9, which rebroadcasts KUSA
 K08NQ-D in Ryndon, Nevada
 K08OB-D in Newell, California
 K08OU-D in Seattle, Washington, on virtual channel 8
 K08OV-D in Nenana, Alaska
 K08OW-D in Hysham, Montana
 K08OX-D in Thomasville, Colorado
 K08OY-D in Plains, Montana
 K08OZ-D in Trout Creek, etc., Montana
 K08PC-D in Hildale, etc., Utah
 K08PE-D in Alamo, etc., Nevada
 K08PF-D in Leamington, Utah
 K08PG-D in Indian Springs, Nevada
 K08PI-D in Salmon, Montana
 K08PJ-D in Cedar City, Utah, on virtual channel 12, which rebroadcasts KMYU
 K08PK-D in Bullhead City, Arizona
 K08PM-D in Wagner, South Dakota
 K08PN-D in Homer, etc., Alaska
 K08PP-D in Rosebud, etc., Montana
 K08PQ-D in Big Arm/Elmo, Montana
 K08PR-D in Missoula, Montana
 K08PT-D in Bakersfield, California
 K08PW-D in Laketown, etc., Utah, on virtual channel 7, which rebroadcasts KUED
 K08PZ-D in Corvallis, Oregon
 K08QA-D in Aurora, etc., Utah
 K08QB-D in Crouch/Garden Valley, Idaho
 K08QC-D in Sigurd & Salina, Utah
 K08QD-D in Woodland & Kamas, Utah
 K08QE-D in Fergus Falls, Minnesota
 K08QF-D in East Price, Utah, on virtual channel 4, which rebroadcasts KTVX
 K08QG-D in Helper, Utah
 K08QH-D in Roosevelt, etc., Utah, on virtual channel 4, which rebroadcasts KTVX
 K08QJ-D in Rio Grande City, Texas
 K08QL-D in Logan, Utah, on virtual channel 8, which rebroadcasts KCSG
 K08QM-D in Wendover, Utah
 K08QN-D in Golden Valley, Arizona
 K32HR-D in Long Valley Junction, Utah
 K46AF-D in Blanding/Monticello, Utah, on virtual channel 2 which rebroadcasts KUTV
 KAET in Phoenix, Arizona, on virtual channel 8
 KAKM in Anchorage, Alaska
 KCCI in Des Moines, Iowa
 KCWC-DT in Lander, Wyoming
 KEET in Hoopa, California
 KESD-TV in Brookings, South Dakota
 KFBB-TV in Great Falls, Montana
 KFLA-LD in Los Angeles, California, on virtual channel 8
 KFMB-TV in San Diego, California, on virtual channel 8
 KGNS-TV in Laredo, Texas
 KHON-TV in Honolulu, Hawaii
 KIFI-TV in Idaho Falls, Idaho
 KIII in Corpus Christi, Texas
 KILA-LD in Cherry Valley, California, on virtual channel 8, which rebroadcasts KFLA-LD
 KJRH-TV in Tulsa, Oklahoma
 KKDJ-LD in Santa Maria, California
 KLKN in Lincoln, Nebraska
 KNMD-TV in Santa Fe, New Mexico, an ATSC 3.0 station
 KNOE-TV in Monroe, Louisiana
 KOBR in Roswell, New Mexico
 KOLO-TV in Reno, Nevada
 KOMU-TV in Columbia, Missouri
 KPSW-LD in Boise, Idaho
 KPTS in Hutchinson, Kansas
 KPTW in Casper, Wyoming
 KQSL in Fort Bragg, California, on virtual channel 8
 KSBW in Salinas, California
 KSWK in Lakin, Kansas
 KSYS in Medford, Oregon
 KTSC in Pueblo, Colorado
 KUAM-TV in Hagåtña, Guam
 KUCB-LD in Dutch Harbor, Alaska
 KUHT in Houston, Texas, on virtual channel 8
 KUMV-TV in Williston, North Dakota
 KUSM-TV in Bozeman, Montana
 KVFR-LD in Redding, California
 KVPS-LD in Indio, California
 KWCZ-LD in Sunnyside-Grandview, Washington
 KWET in Cheyenne, Oklahoma
 KWVC-LD in Malaga, etc., Washington
 KWYP-DT in Laramie, Wyoming
 KXMP-LD in Harrison, Arkansas
 KZDF-LD in Santa Barbara, California
 KZSD-TV in Martin, South Dakota
 W08AT-D in Cherokee, North Carolina
 W08BF-D in Spruce Pine, North Carolina, on virtual channel 7, which rebroadcasts WSPA-TV
 W08ED-D in Marathon, Florida, on virtual channel 8, which rebroadcasts WGEN-TV
 W08EH-D in Ponce, Puerto Rico, on virtual channel 8
 W08EI-D in Guaynabo, Puerto Rico, on virtual channel 8
 W08EJ-D in Anasco, Puerto Rico, on virtual channel 8
 WAGM-TV in Presque Isle, Maine
 WBNA in Louisville, Kentucky
 WBNG-TV in Binghamton, New York
 WDAZ-TV in Devil's Lake, North Dakota
 WDEF-TV in Chattanooga, Tennessee
 WDHS in Iron Mountain, Michigan
 WDSE in Duluth, Minnesota
 WFAA in Dallas, Texas, on virtual channel 8
 WGAL in Lancaster, Pennsylvania
 WGCT-CD in Columbus, Ohio, on virtual channel 39, which rebroadcasts WOCB-CD
 WGEN-LD in Miami, Florida, on virtual channel 8, which rebroadcasts WGEN-TV
 WGEN-TV in Key West, Florida, on virtual channel 8
 WGSC-CD in Murrells Inlet, South Carolina
 WGSI-CD in Murrells Inlet, South Carolina, uses WGSC-CD's spectrum
 WGTQ in Sault Ste. Marie, Michigan
 WIGL-LD in Athens, Georgia, on virtual channel 38
 WIIH-CD in Indianapolis, Indiana, on virtual channel 17
 WJW in Cleveland, Ohio, on virtual channel 8
 WKBT-DT in La Crosse, Wisconsin
 WLIO in Lima, Ohio
 WMAB-TV in Mississippi State, Mississippi
 WMTW in Poland Spring, Maine
 WMVS in Milwaukee, Wisconsin, on virtual channel 10
 WMVT in Milwaukee, Wisconsin, uses WMVS' spectrum, on virtual channel 36
 WMWC-TV in Galesburg, Illinois
 WNBW-DT in Gainesville, Florida
 WNCN in Goldsboro, North Carolina, on virtual channel 17
 WNJB in New Brunswick, New Jersey, on virtual channel 58
 WNJN in Montclair, New Jersey, which uses WNJB's spectrum, on virtual channel 50
 WNMU in Marquette, Michigan
 WNTV in Greenville, South Carolina, on virtual channel 29
 WOFT-LD in Ocala, Florida, on virtual channel 8
 WRET-TV in Spartanburg, South Carolina, uses WNTV's spectrum, on virtual channel 49
 WSFA in Montgomery, Alabama
 WSIU-TV in Carbondale, Illinois
 WSWP-TV in Grandview, West Virginia
 WUDT-LD in Detroit, Michigan
 WUPV in Ashland, Virginia
 WVAN-TV in Savannah, Georgia
 WVFW-LD in Miami, Florida, on virtual channel 8, which rebroadcasts WGEN-TV
 WVMY-LD in Parkersburg, West Virginia
 WVNS-TV in Lewisburg, West Virginia
 WWCP-TV in Johnstown, Pennsylvania
 WWMT in Kalamazoo, Michigan
 WWNY-TV in Carthage, New York
 WWVW-LD in Wheeling, West Virginia
 WXOD-LD in Palm Beach, Florida
 WXXA-TV in Albany, New York

The following stations, which are no longer licensed, formerly broadcast on digital channel 8:
 K08AX-D in Ardenvoir, Washington
 K08BA-D in Orondo, etc., Washington
 K08BG-D in Troy, Montana
 K08ID-D in Tuluksak, Alaska
 K08JZ-D in Waunita Hot Springs, Colorado
 K08LW-D in Kenai/Soldotna, Alaska
 K08NP-D in John Day, Oregon
 K08OR-D in Canby, California
 WFXI in Morehead City, North Carolina

References

08 digital